Kaarlo Jaakko Juhani Hintikka (12 January 1929 – 12 August 2015) was a Finnish philosopher and logician.

Life and career
Hintikka was born in Helsingin maalaiskunta (now Vantaa).

In 1953, he received his doctorate from the University of Helsinki for a thesis entitled Distributive Normal Forms in the Calculus of Predicates.  He was a student of Georg Henrik von Wright.

Hintikka was a Junior Fellow at Harvard University (1956-1969), and held several professorial appointments at the University of Helsinki, the Academy of Finland, Stanford University, Florida State University and finally Boston University from 1990 until his death.  He was the prolific author or co-author of over 30 books and over 300 scholarly articles, Hintikka contributed to mathematical logic, philosophical logic, the philosophy of mathematics, epistemology, language theory, and the philosophy of science. His works have appeared in over nine languages.

Hintikka edited the academic journal Synthese from 1962 to 2002, and was a consultant editor for more than ten journals. He was the first vice-president of the Fédération Internationale des Sociétés de Philosophie, the Vice-President of the Institut International de Philosophie (1993–1996), as well as a member of the American Philosophical Association, the International Union of History and Philosophy of Science, Association for Symbolic Logic, and a member of the governing board of the Philosophy of Science Association. In 2005, he won the Rolf Schock Prize in logic and philosophy "for his pioneering contributions to the logical analysis of modal concepts, in particular the concepts of knowledge and belief". In 1985, he was president of the Florida Philosophical Association.

He was a member of the Norwegian Academy of Science and Letters. On May 26, 2000 Hintikka received an honorary doctorate from the Faculty of History and Philosophy at Uppsala University, Sweden

Philosophical work

Hintikka is regarded as the founder of formal epistemic logic and of game semantics for logic. Early in his career, he devised a semantics of modal logic essentially analogous to Saul Kripke's frame semantics, and discovered the now widely taught semantic tableau, independently of Evert Willem Beth. Later, he worked mainly on game semantics, and on independence-friendly logic, known for its "branching quantifiers", which he believed do better justice to our intuitions about quantifiers than does conventional first-order logic. He did important exegetical work on Aristotle, Immanuel Kant, Ludwig Wittgenstein, and Charles Sanders Peirce. Hintikka's work can be seen as a continuation of the analytic tendency in philosophy founded by Franz Brentano and Peirce, advanced by Gottlob Frege and Bertrand Russell, and continued by Rudolf Carnap, Willard Van Orman Quine, and by Hintikka's teacher Georg Henrik von Wright. For instance, in 1998 he wrote The Principles of Mathematics Revisited, which takes an exploratory stance comparable to that Russell made with his The Principles of Mathematics in 1903.

Selected books

For a bibliography, see Auxier and Hahn (2006).
 1962. Knowledge and Belief – An Introduction to the Logic of the Two Notions 
 1969. Models for Modalities: Selected Essays 
 1975. The intentions of intentionality and other new models for modalities 
 1976. The semantics of questions and the questions of semantics: case studies in the interrelations of logic, semantics, and syntax 
 1989. The Logic of Epistemology and the Epistemology of Logic 
 1996. Ludwig Wittgenstein: Half-Truths and One-and-a-Half-Truths 
 1996. Lingua Universalis vs Calculus Ratiocinator 
 1996. The Principles of Mathematics Revisited 
 1998. Paradigms for Language Theory and Other Essays 
 1998. Language, Truth and Logic in Mathematics 
 1999. Inquiry as Inquiry: A Logic of Scientific Discovery 
 2004. Analyses of Aristotle 
 2007. Socratic Epistemology: Explorations of Knowledge-Seeking by Questioning

See also

 Rudolf Carnap
 Saul Kripke
 Charles Sanders Peirce
 Willard Van Orman Quine
 Alfred Tarski
 Ludwig Wittgenstein
 Doxastic logic
 Hintikka set

Notes

Further reading
Auxier, R.E., &  Hahn, L. (eds.) 2006. The Philosophy of Jaakko Hintikka (The Library of Living Philosophers). Open Court. Includes a complete bibliography of Hintikka's publications. 
 Bogdan, Radu (ed.) 1987. Jaakko Hintikka. Kluwer Academic Publishers. 
 Kolak, Daniel 2001. On Hintikka. Wadsworth. 
 Kolak, Daniel & Symons, John (eds.) 2004. Quantifiers, Questions and Quantum Physics: Essays on the Philosophy of Jaakko Hintikka. Springer.

External links
 
 Jaakko Hintikka's personal website
 Philosopher Jaakko Hintikka reveals love affair between his wife and JFK. Helsinki Times.
 Jaakko Hintikka in 375 humanists – 20 May 2015. Faculty of Arts, University of Helsinki.

1929 births
20th-century Finnish philosophers
21st-century Finnish philosophers
Analytic philosophers
Florida State University faculty
Game theorists
2015 deaths
Logicians
Members of the Norwegian Academy of Science and Letters
Foreign Members of the Russian Academy of Sciences
Modal logicians
People from Vantaa
Philosophers of language
Philosophers of mathematics
Rolf Schock Prize laureates
Boston University faculty
Finnish expatriates in the United States
Harvard Fellows
Members of the American Philosophical Society